Adventures from the Book of Virtues is an American animated children's television series based on the books The Book of Virtues: A Treasury of Great Moral Stories, and The Children's Book of Virtues, both by William Bennett, who served as Secretary of Education under President Ronald Reagan. The program focuses on two main human characters, Annie and Zach, who learn many life lessons from their friends Plato the bison, Aurora the red-tailed hawk, Aristotle the prairie dog, and Socrates the bobcat. These lessons are told in the form of animated segments based on stories from a variety of origins including Bible stories, fairy tales, fables, mythology, and folk stories from diverse cultures.

Adventures from the Book of Virtues originally aired as part of PBS' children's programming block from September 2, 1996 until the series finale in December 2000; an epilogue to the series would be released on home video in June 2001. There was a two-year gap in between the second and third seasons; the series' production ended in June 2000. Reruns of the series were broadcast on PBS Kids until September 4, 2005, and on the now-defunct Qubo from November 3, 2008 until September 24, 2017.

Plot 
The series centered on two best friends: 10-year-old Annie Redfeather, who is Native American, and 11-year-old Zach Nichols, who is white. In each episode of the series, one of them commits an act contrary to that day's chosen virtue (loyalty, compassion, courage, moderation, honesty, etc.) and suffers pain as a result (be it physical or moral). They seek counsel of one of Annie's animal friends. These animal friends are four anthropomorphic mountain-dwelling entities who between them possess immense knowledge of legends and literature as well as common sense and a lively sense of fun. They utilize classical works of famous authors, philosophers, poets, as well as fables and myths to communicate the truth of virtue to Zach and Annie. Plato, the oldest, is a scholarly bison; Aurora, the most gentle, is a Red-tailed hawk; Socrates "Soch" is a rambunctious bobcat; and Aristotle "Ari" is a prairie dog who is seldom without his bag of books. These four, whose existence seems a secret from the majority of humans in the town of Spring Valley, advise Annie and Zach patiently and often. The children then proceed to live according to the virtue of the day, completing what they have begun.

Cast

Principal voice actors 

Frank Welker also voices Aegeus, Minotaur, Dharma, Mongal Dog, The Man, and The Dog. Jim Cummings also voices Pythias, Camel, Ox, Genghis Khan, Mordecai, and Cyclops. Kath Soucie also voices Aunt Polly, George Washington, Queen Vashti, and Snake-Child.

In 2006, the first two seasons were overdubbed in Singapore at Studio Bizarro, with voice direction by Brian Zimmerman, Joseph Murray and Chuck Powers with all of them acting in it as well, alongside Denise Tan, Chio-Su Ping, and Brad Boyer. According to Powers, PorchLight could not afford to pay residual royalties to the celebrity voice actors in the region. The dub is available on recent DVD releases and TV airings on Qubo and the former BYUtv.

Guest stars 
Adventures from the Book of Virtues featured prominent voice actors and celebrities on the series' 39 episodes, including the following:

 Edward Asner as Daniel
 Kathy Bates as Girls' Mother
 Scott Bakula as Elbagast
 Irene Bedard as Morning Light, Sharp Eyes
 Ed Begley Jr. as William Tell, Alec
 Jeff Bennett as The Frog Prince, Samuel Washington
 Dean Cain as King Charlemagne
 Lacey Chabert as Younger Daughter
 Tim Curry as King Minos, Albrecht Gessler
 Olivia d'Abo as Anne Sullivan
 Christine Cavanaugh as Frog-Child
 Daniel Davis as Horse
 Pam Dawber as Liese
 Michael Dorn as Apollo
 Shelley Duvall as Fairy
 John Forsythe as Daedalus
 Henry Gibson as Dick's Please
 Joanna Gleason as Della
 Gilbert Gottfried as the Rat
 Michael Gough as Abraham Lincoln
 Jennifer Hale as Mountain Cloud, Maiden
 Mark Hamill as Theseus, Saint George
 Mark Harmon as Odysseus
 Tippi Hedren as Madame Sofroni
 Charlton Heston as Cincinnatus
 Michael Horse as Strong Wind, Chief
 Arte Johnson as John's Please
 Dean Jones as Chauncey
 Andrew Lawrence as Ben Rogers
 Matthew Lawrence as Tom Sawyer
 Jennifer Jason Leigh as Alexandra
 Sherry Lynn as Marygold
 Tress MacNeille as Teacher, Peter's Mother
 Malcolm McDowell as Indra
 Candi Milo as Quiet Fire
 Ricardo Montalbán as Brother Pedro, Merchant
 Esai Morales as Guillermo
 Pat Morita as Mr. Straw
 Kathy Najimy as Old Woman
 Paige O'Hara as Princess (The Frog Prince), June Washington
 Rob Paulsen as Peter
 Brock Peters as King Ahasuerus
 Lou Diamond Phillips as Martin  
 Paula Poundstone as Jinn
 Clive Revill as King Midas
 Julian Sands as Henry
 Chris Sarandon as Jim
 Ben Savage as Jinkyswoitmaya
 George Segal as Eli
 Charles Shaughnessy as Charles
 Tara Strong (credited as "Tara Charendoff") as Little Girl
 Wes Studi as Scarface
 Joan Van Ark as Queen Esther
 B. J. Ward as Mrs. Nichols, Princess Ariadne, Walter Tell
 Elijah Wood as Icarus
 Alfre Woodard as Harriet Tubman
 Michael York as Androcles

Production 
Much of the history of the production of Adventures from the Book of Virtues is situated within the strident culture wars within U.S. politics in the 1990s. In June 1994, television producer Bruce D. Johnson, then an executive vice-president at Hanna-Barbera, was browsing through a bookstore in Washington, DC when he stumbled upon Bennett's 1993 book of moral tales, The Book of Virtues. Compelled by the book's themes, Johnson called Bennett with the idea of an animated television program for children based upon the book. According to Johnson:

"...I placed a cold call to William Bennett. To my surprise, he takes the call; to my chagrin, he informs me that 19 other companies have already approached him, including Disney, and that he was 'down the road' on a probable deal at that moment. Nevertheless, I inform him of my experience producing anthologies and express an interest in producing his book wherever it ended up. We have a pleasant conversation, and he offhandedly asks me to fax my resume to him. I do."

Johnson and Bennett eventually met and bonded over their shared dedication to children's television and moral philosophy. From there, the two agreed to begin production on what would become Adventures.

That same year in the 1994 midterm elections, the Republican Party won control of the U.S. House of Representatives and the Senate, giving the Party control of Congress for the first time in four decades. In January 1995, Speaker of the House Newt Gingrich expressed publicly his desire to "zero out" federal funding for PBS, stating, "Why would you say to some poor worker out here with three kids, 'We're now going to take your money and tax you for a program that you may never watch?'" As the debate over federal funding for public broadcasting was being waged in Congress, Johnson shopped the developing project around to various networks, hoping to find one that would air Adventures in a prime time slot. The final taker was PBS. Many conservative figures approved of PBS's pickup of the series. When asked whether PBS was attempting to appease Congressional Republicans by accepting a series developed by a well-regarded Reagan cabinet appointee, PBS President Ervin S. Duggan denied, stating, "We are not buying Bill Bennett's opinions... The series is not political at all."

The series sought to illustrate themes of common virtues through famous all-embracing heroes and stories, based on Bennett's Book of Virtues. The core audience were families with children who were between the ages of 6 and 10 years old. Music for the opening sequence and the first season was produced by J. A. C. Redford.

In 2006, the first two seasons were redubbed in Singapore. According to Chuck Powers, one of the voice actors in the Singaporean dub, PorchLight redubbed the series because the studio could not afford to pay royalties to the celebrity voice actors.

Episodes

Series overview

Season 1 (1996–1997)

Season 2 (1998)

Season 3 (2000)

Epilogue

Broadcast and home media releases 
The series was originally aired as part of PBS' children's programming block from September 2, 1996 until the series finale in December 2000; an epilogue to the series would be released on home video in June 2001. Reruns of the series were broadcast on PBS Kids until September 4, 2005, and on the now-defunct Qubo from November 3, 2008 until September 24, 2017.
Turner Home Entertainment under license to PBS Home Video, released several videotapes of the series during 1996–1997. They were later re-released through Warner Bros. Home Entertainment. During 2008 and 2010, PorchLight Entertainment released several  DVDs of the series. The series became available for streaming with the launch of Yippee in December 2019.

References

External links 
 Official website (Archive)
 

1996 American television series debuts
2000 American television series endings
1990s American animated television series
2000s American animated television series
1990s American anthology television series
2000s American anthology television series
American children's animated adventure television series
American children's animated anthology television series
American children's animated education television series
American children's animated fantasy television series
American television shows based on children's books
Television shows set in California
English-language television shows
PBS original programming
PBS Kids shows
Reading and literacy television series
Qubo
Animated television series about birds
Animated television series about cats
Animated television series about children
Animated television series about dogs